Zak Rian Brunt (born 17 November 2001) is an English professional footballer who plays as a midfielder for Boreham Wood on loan from Sheffield United.

Club career
Having started his career at Sheffield United, Brunt joined a number of academies, including both Manchester City and Manchester United, before settling at Derby County. Due to a large release clause, he dropped down to non-league football in 2017 to sign with Matlock Town, where he made his debut in a league match as an 87th-minute substitute against Witton Albion, aged just sixteen years and one day. 

In 2018, Brunt returned to Sheffield United. On 10 August 2021, Brunt made his first-team debut for Sheffield United in an EFL Cup first-round victory over Carlisle United before going on to appear in the second round also. 

On 28 October 2021, Brunt joined National League side Southend United on loan until January 2022. In January 2022, Brunt joined Notts County on loan until the end of the season following the expiration of his loan at Southend United. On 25 July 2022, Brunt returned to the National League when he joined Boreham Wood on a season-long loan deal.

Career statistics

References

2001 births
Living people
Footballers from Chesterfield
English footballers
Association football midfielders
Sheffield United F.C. players
Aston Villa F.C. players
Manchester City F.C. players
Manchester United F.C. players
Derby County F.C. players
Matlock Town F.C. players
Southend United F.C. players
Notts County F.C. players
Boreham Wood F.C. players
Northern Premier League players
National League (English football) players